Papyrus 138 (designated as 𝔓138 in the Gregory-Aland numbering system), is an early copy of the New Testament in Greek. It is a papyrus manuscript of Luke. The text survives on fragments from one edge of a single leaf containing parts of verses 3:13–17 on the front and 3:25-30 on the back. The manuscript has been assigned paleographically to the 3rd century.

Location 
𝔓138 is housed at the Sackler Library (P. Oxy 5346) at the University of Oxford.

Textual Variants 

While there are dozens of places of variation amongst the oldest uncials and papyri in these verses, 𝔓138 is so fragmentary that none are visible.

See also 
 List of New Testament papyri

References 

New Testament papyri
3rd-century biblical manuscripts
Early Greek manuscripts of the New Testament